Vorskla Poltava, formerly known as Zhytlobud-2 Kharkiv is Ukrainian professional women's football team of FC Vorskla from Poltava, Ukraine (previously represented Kharkiv). In 2021 it became grandfathered into FC Vorskla Poltava as its women football department. The team plays at the Ukrainian Women's League top tier.

As the Kharkiv club it used to cooperate with Kharkiv Regional College of Physical Culture and Sports.

History
It all started with a girl under-13 team that was formed in 2004 and next year won the Ukrainian championship among girls that took place in Sevastopol. Later the team participated on few occasions at futsal competitions. 

In 2007 the football team became known as Zhytlobud-2 Kharkiv after its main sponsor. In 2010, based on the team there was established a club which beside its female team also fields a male team in amateur competitions.

In 2010 the club also fielded its floorball team.

In 2012 the club debuted in national league competitions.

In 2017 the club took part in the first Ukrainian beach soccer competitions among women teams in Odesa. After placing second in a group stage, they were eliminated during quarterfinals.

In 2020 the club lost its founder Yuriy Krolenko who died at age of 82.

Its 2022–23 UEFA Women's Champions League season the club started under the name "Vorskla-Kharkiv-2". On 10 September 2022 at the start of the domestic season, it was announced that Zhytlobud-2 has officially switched to Vorskla. At its first match against Shakhtar Donetsk, players were dressed in jerseys of Vorksla yet with Zhytlobud-2 logo.

Honours
Higher Division 
 champions (3): 2016, 2017, 2019–20
 runners-up (4): 2014, 2017–18, 2018–19, 2020–21
 Women's Cup
 winners (2): 2019–20, 2020–21

Current squad
2022

European History
In European competitions the club debuted in 2017 with a game against Romanian side.

References

External links
  Official Website
  Old Website
  Vorskla. womensfootball.com.ua

 
Women's football clubs in Ukraine
2007 establishments in Ukraine
Football clubs in Poltava
Association football clubs established in 2007
Ukrainian Women's League clubs
FC Vorskla Poltava